Surrender is the third studio album from Bizzle. God Over Money Records released the album on October 23, 2015. He worked with Beanz-N-Kornbread, Boi-1da, The Cratez, Dilemma, Dreamcatchers, Marv4MoBeats, and Vybe, in the production of this album.

Critical reception

Cal Moore, giving the album three and a half stars from The Christian Manifesto, writes, "Surrender is a still a progression for Bizzle."

Tare-el Varnes of Up Nxt Music gives Bizzle five stars for this album saying "This is the way Gospel Hip-Hop should open and close the fourth quarter!"

Track listing

Chart performance

References

2015 albums
Albums produced by Boi-1da
Bizzle albums